Monique Anne Maria "Micky" Adriaansens (born 1 March 1964) is a Dutch politician, lawyer and administrator who has served as Minister of Economic Affairs and Climate Policy in the Fourth Rutte cabinet since 10 January 2022. A member of the People's Party for Freedom and Democracy (VVD), she was previously a member of the Senate (2019–2022).

Career
A native of Schiedam, Adriaansens attended the Municipal Gymnasium in Hilversum. She studied Law, Health Policy and Management at the Erasmus University in Rotterdam. During her studies, she was active in the Hermes House Band.

She then worked for the law firm AKD in bankruptcy law. Between 1999 and 2003 Adriaansens worked as a consultant at Twynstra Gudde, before she became active as a health care administrator. On 1 June 2016, she returned to Twynstra Gudde where she became chairwoman of the board of directors. During her time in the private sector, she also held various supervisory directorships.

She was president of the Larensche Mixed Hockey Club (2012–2017), which she helped out of debt. She received the municipal medal of honour from the municipality of Laren for this in 2017; she was appointed an honorary member of the club in 2018.

She was a member of the Senate from June 2019 to January 2022, when she was appointed Minister of Economic Affairs and Climate Policy in the Fourth Rutte cabinet. In the Senate, she served as chair of the permanent Committee on Health, Welfare and Sport.

References

Dutch corporate directors

People's Party for Freedom and Democracy politicians
Members of the Senate (Netherlands)
Ministers of Economic Affairs of the Netherlands
Dutch lawyers
1964 births
People from Schiedam
Living people
Women government ministers of the Netherlands